Tirnaneill is a townland situated in north County Monaghan in Ireland, about halfway between Emyvale and Monaghan Town at a crossroads on the N2 road known as Tirnaneill Cross.

History
It is believed that the townland was settled by the High King Uí Néill in 200 AD (hence the name, which means "land of the O'Neills"). It is said he settled here because of its proximity to the N2 (handy for popping in and out of town), and the beauty and quality of land that could not be matched anywhere else in Ireland; land he wanted for himself.

Townlands of County Monaghan